Fullen Gaels Hurling and Camogie Club is a Gaelic Athletic Association club based in Manchester, England. Although affiliated to Lancashire GAA it mainly competes in Warwickshire GAA competitions.

History
Fullen Gaels were formed in February 2005 in St Kentigerns Social Club, Fallowfield, Manchester by a small group which includes Denis Cleary (St Brendan’s GAC) Richard Deloughry (St Anne’s GAC) Seán Hackett (St Lawrence’s) and Michael Kennedy (St Brendan’s GAC) passionate about hurling and with a desire to reintroduce the sport to (historic) Lancashire after an absence of two decades, following the Sarsfields club's disbandment.

The Club was named after Fr Emmet Fullen of Derry, who was a founding member of St Lawrence's GFC, a former Lancashire player and chairman of the Lancashire County Board.

The original club colours chosen were red and white, the colours of Derry, colours which were not worn by any of the clubs in the Lancashire GAA. The original crest was designed by Seán Hackett then county secretary (who also designed the Lancashire County crest). The crest depicted the Red Rose of Lancaster, the Shamrock representing the Irish heritage of the club, and set inside a cross recognising Fr. Fullen's ministry.

The club colours and crest were later changed to include symbols of Manchester, GAA, as well as representing Fr Fullen. The top left is the Fullen family crest while the top right is the shamrock representing the Irish heritage of the club. These are on amber and black backgrounds, the new club colours. At the bottom of the crest, the bee represents the worker bee of Manchester, a symbol of Manchester from the industrial revolution when Manchester was known as the hive of activity with hard-working citizens. The ship is an iconic symbol of Manchester representing the Manchester ship canal and 2005 is the year the club was formed.

Club Honours:
2005: Runners-up, Warwickshire Senior Hurling Championship; Runners-up, Warwickshire Houlihan Cup
2006: Winners, London Ronan Cup
2008: Runners-up, Warwickshire Senior Hurling Championship;
2009: Runners-up, Warwickshire Senior Hurling Championship;
2010: Winners, Warwickshire Senior Hurling Championship; Winners, All-Britain Junior Club Hurling Championship
2011: Winners, Warwickshire Senior Hurling Championship; Winners, All-Britain Junior Club Hurling Championship
2012: Winners, Warwickshire Senior Hurling Championship; Winners, All-Britain Junior Club Hurling Championship
2013: Winners, Warwickshire Senior Hurling Championship; Winners, All-Britain Junior Club Hurling Championship
2014: Winners, Lancashire Senior Hurling Championship; All-Britain Junior Club Hurling Championship

Hurling
Due to lack of other hurling clubs in the Lancashire GAA to which they are affiliated, Fullen Gaels compete in the Warwickshire county championship, along with such clubs as John Mitchel's, Roger Casement's, Erin go Bragh and Yorkshire Emeralds. The club competed in the London Hurling League division 2 in 2006, winning one game and losing three.

Fullen Gaels train at Hough End, although Páirc na hÉireann, in Solihull, is where most matches with other teams occur. Fullen Gaels have proven themselves to be worthy challengers in the Warwickshire Senior Hurling Championship, reaching two finals in their first season, though losing on both occasions to John Mitchel's and Roger Casement's respectively. However, 2006 would bring to Manchester the first silverware in the Gaels' history, when they won the Ronan Cup at British GAA headquarters at Emerald GAA Grounds, London. They defeated Clann na Gael by 3-11 to 1-11. They were eliminated from the Warwickshire SHC by Casement's at the semi-final stage by conceding a goal in the last minute, and again lost to Casement's in the Houlihan Cup semi-final, where they were beaten by four points in September 2006.

2010 was a historic year for the Fullen Gaels club as they won the Warwickshire SHC and the All-Britain Junior Hurling Club Championships. They hosted eventual All-Ireland JCHC winners Meelin in the All-Ireland Quarter Final, losing after a gallant display. They retained the Warwickshire and All-Britain club titles in 2011 and were beaten in the All-Ireland JCHC Semi-Final by Charleville at Walsh Park in Waterford. After retaining the Warwickshire and All-Britain club titles again in 2012, they reached the All-Ireland JCHC Final in 2013 where they lost narrowly to Thomastown of Kilkenny at Croke Park on a scoreline of 2-17 to 2-14.

2014 saw the reformation of the Lancashire Championship after an absence of 19 years after Fullen Gaels [Manchester], Yorkshire Emeralds [Leeds] & Wolfe Tones [Liverpool] agreed to leave the Warwickshire competition.

Honours
Lancashire Senior Hurling Club Championship (7)
2014, 2016, 2017, 2018, 2019, 2020, 2021
All Britain Hurling Club Championship (8) (2019/2020, not run due to Covid)
2010, 2011, 2012, 2013, 2014, 2015, 2016, 2021
Warwickshire Senior Hurling Championship (4)
2010, 2011, 2012, 2013; Runners-up 2005, 2008, 2009
Houlihan Cup (Warwickshire)
Runners-up 2005, 2007
Ronan Cup (London) (1)
2006 
All-Ireland Junior Club Hurling Championship
Runners-up 2013, 2015

Camogie
In 2011 the club expanded with the addition of a Camogie team to the club. They had their first entry into competitive championship in 2012 participating in the London Senior League and London Senior championship. They continued to compete at senior level from 2012-2014 and in 2015, following player and club re-grading, began competing in the All Britain Junior League and Championship. After two years competing at Junior level, Fullen Gaels came out on top as All Britain Championship winners in 2017 and progressed to Intermediate championship in the 2018 season. After an extraordinary year Fullen Gaels camogie achieved an unbeaten season as all Britain champions in both League and Championship. A historic first, the girls then travelled home to Ireland to compete in the All Ireland Junior B club semi final where they were narrowly defeated by 2 points against Clontibret of Monaghan. The 2019 season sees the girls progress to Senior championship, 5 years since the girls first played at this level.

Honours:

Senior All Britain Championship finalists and runners up 2013.
Junior All Britain League finalists and runners up 2015, 2017.
Birmingham Women's 7's Tournament Shield Winners 2014, Tournament Winners 2017.
Junior All-Britain Championship Winners 2017.
Intermediate All-Britain League Winners 2018.
Intermediate All-Britain Championship Winners 2018.
All Ireland Junior B Semi finalists 2018

External links
 Fullen Gaels website
 Fullen Gaels page on Lancashire GAA website

Organisations based in Manchester
Warwickshire GAA
Sport in Warwickshire
Hurling clubs in Britain
Sport in Manchester